Jim Hinga (September 23, 1924 – March 10, 2002) was an American college basketball coach. Hinga coached Ball State University from 1954 to 1968 and compiled a 154–169 career mark, which is still a school record for victories. He also was an assistant football and track coach and Ball State's manager of physical education and athletic facilities and services from 1969 to 1981.

Playing career

High school
Hinga helped his team to a three-year record of 21–2–2 (.920). In his junior season in 1939–40, he was named an all-state football end while leading the Redskins to the Associated Press and United Press International state title.  His teammate, Robert Cowan, would go on to a three-year career in the National Football League. Hinga was also a member of the two-time IHSAA state champion track and field team and won the 440-yard race.

College
He attended Purdue University and played football and track as a freshman during the 1942–43 school year. Hinga then joined the United States Air Force during World War II. He returned to Purdue in the fall of 1944 then played basketball for head coach Piggy Lambert. Two teammates who would go on to successful playing careers were Paul Hoffman and Howie Williams.

Coaching career

High school
Hinga, who previously coached basketball, football and track at West Lafayette and Fort Wayne North High Schools from 1947 to 1954, was inducted into the Indiana Basketball Hall of Fame in 1983.  He was the head basketball coach and assistant football coach under former high school teammate Bob Cowan at their alma mater.

College
Hinga was named the head basketball coach at Ball State Teachers College in the fall of 1954. He coached for 14 seasons (still the longest tenure Ball State men's basketball coaching tenure in program history) and built a record of 154–169 (.477).  Following his resignation, he was hired to be the first full-time commissioner of the Indiana Collegiate Conference from 1970 until 1978, when it became the Heartland Conference; he then continued as commissioner until retiring in 1984.

His third team in 1956–57 would achieve a record of 19–8 (7–5 in the ICC). The squad would be the first to represent the university in any postseason tournament as it advanced to the 1957 NAIA Division I men's basketball tournament.  Once in Kansas City, the Cardinals ran past Troy State by 28 points but could not get past a tough Texas Southern squad, dropping their second-round game, 97–72.  The Cardinals were led by Tom Dobbs and his 17.0 points per game average.

After ten seasons at Ball State, Hinga led the Cardinals back to the post-season as they participated in the 1964 NCAA Men's Division II basketball tournament.  The Cardinals dropped both games to place fourth in the region. The Cardinals were led by Ed Butler, their all-time leader in rebounds, who would be named to the Ball State Hall of Fame in 1979.

After 14 seasons at Ball State, Hinga was hired as the full-time commissioner of the Indiana Collegiate Conference, he led the conference from its transition from a hybrid conference (a mix of NCAA Division I, II, and III schools) to a primarily NCAA Division II and III conference and a re-branding as the "Heartland Conference" as it admitted its first non-Indiana based university. Hinga was the first commissioner of the Heartland Collegiate Conference and presided until 1984.

Head coaching record

References

1924 births
2002 deaths
American men's basketball players
Ball State Cardinals football coaches
Ball State Cardinals men's basketball coaches
Ball State Cardinals track and field coaches
Basketball coaches from Indiana
Basketball players from Fort Wayne, Indiana
College men's basketball head coaches in the United States
High school basketball coaches in the United States
High school football coaches in Indiana
Indiana Collegiate Conference commissioners
Players of American football from Fort Wayne, Indiana
Purdue Boilermakers football players
Purdue Boilermakers men's basketball players
Shooting guards
Sportspeople from Fort Wayne, Indiana